Kosmos 2001 ( meaning Cosmos 2001) is a Soviet US-K missile early warning satellite which was launched in 1989 as part of the Soviet military's Oko programme. The satellite is designed to identify missile launches using optical telescopes and infrared sensors.

Kosmos 2001 was launched from Site 43/3 at Plesetsk Cosmodrome in the Russian SSR. A Molniya-M carrier rocket with a 2BL upper stage was used to perform the launch, which took place at 04:21 UTC on 14 February 1989. The launch successfully placed the satellite into a molniya orbit. It subsequently received its Kosmos designation, and the international designator 1989-011A. The United States Space Command assigned it the Satellite Catalog Number 19796.

It re-entered the Earth's atmosphere on 22 September 2008.

See also

List of Kosmos satellites (2001–2250)
List of R-7 launches (1985–1989)
1989 in spaceflight
List of Oko satellites

References

Kosmos satellites
Oko
Spacecraft launched by Molniya-M rockets
Spacecraft which reentered in 2008
1989 in the Soviet Union
Spacecraft launched in 1989